The following television stations broadcast on digital channel 6 in the United States:

 K06AA-D in Broadus, Montana, on virtual channel 8, which rebroadcasts KULR-TV
 K06AE-D in Prescott, Arizona, on virtual channel 2, which rebroadcasts KNAZ-TV
 K06AV-D in Wolf Point, Montana, on virtual channel 20, which rebroadcasts K20JS-D
 K06DM-D in Panaca, Nevada, on virtual channel 8, which rebroadcasts KLAS-TV
 K06FE-D in Miles City, Montana, on virtual channel 8, which rebroadcasts KULR-TV
 K06GW-D in New Castle, Colorado, on virtual channel 18, which rebroadcasts KRMJ
 K06HN-D in Gunnison, Colorado, on virtual channel 8
 K06HT-D in Ely, Nevada, on virtual channel 5, which rebroadcasts KVVU-TV
 K06HU-D in Aspen, Colorado, on virtual channel 18, which rebroadcasts KRMJ
 K06HZ-D in Paonia, Colorado
 K06IQ-D in Newberry Springs, California, on virtual channel 11, which rebroadcasts KTTV
 K06JA-D in Cedar Canyon, Utah, on virtual channel 4, which rebroadcasts KTVX
 K06JC-D in Chadron, Nebraska, on virtual channel 13, which rebroadcasts KTNE-TV
 K06KA-D in Fort Jones, etc., California, on virtual channel 10, which rebroadcasts KTVL
 K06KQ-D in Manhattan, Nevada, on virtual channel 11, which rebroadcasts KRXI-TV
 K06KR-D in Crawford, Nebraska, on virtual channel 13, which rebroadcasts KTNE-TV
 K06MK-D in Elko, Nevada, on virtual channel 2, which rebroadcasts KTVN
 K06NS-D in Chiloquin, Oregon, on virtual channel 2, which rebroadcasts KOTI
 K06NT-D in Dolores, Colorado, on virtual channel 6
 K06NV-D in White Sulphur Springs, Montana, on virtual channel 4, which rebroadcasts KHMT
 K06NY-D in Ryndon, Nevada, on virtual channel 2, which rebroadcasts KTVN
 K06PG-D in Laughlin, Nevada, on virtual channel 10, which rebroadcasts KLVX
 K06PT-D in Columbia, Missouri
 K06PU-D in Yakima, Washington
 K06QA-D in Odessa, Texas
 K06QD-D in Pasco, Washington
 K06QF-D in Heron, Montana, on virtual channel 4, which rebroadcasts KXLY-TV
 K06QI-D in Alamogordo, New Mexico
 K06QJ-D in Sioux Falls, South Dakota
 K06QL-D in Modesto, California
 K06QN-D in Judith Gap, Montana, on virtual channel 2, which rebroadcasts KTVQ
 K06QP-D in Juneau, Alaska, on virtual channel 6
 K06QR-D in Eugene, Oregon
 K06QS-D in Salina & Redmond, Utah, on virtual channel 14, which rebroadcasts KJZZ-TV
 K06QW-D in Sentinel, Arizona
 K06QX-D in Reno, Nevada
 KBFW-LD in Arlington, Texas
 KBSD-DT in Ensign, Kansas, on virtual channel 6
 KBKF-LD in San Jose, California, an ATSC 3.0 station, on virtual channel 6
 KCVH-LD in Houston, Texas, on virtual channel 6
 KEFM-LD in Sacramento, California, an ATSC 3.0 station, on virtual channel 9
 KFLZ-LD in San Antonio, Texas
 KFMY-LD in Petaluma, California, on virtual channel 6
 KIPS-LD in Beaumont, Texas, on virtual channel 6
 KJDN-LD in Logan, Utah
 KMCF-LD in Visalia, California
 KNXT-LD in Bakersfield, California
 KPWC-LD in Tillamook, Oregon
 KRPE-LD in San Diego, California
 KTVJ-LD in Nampa, Idaho
 KTVM-TV in Butte, Montana, on virtual channel 6, which will move to channel 20
 KUHD-LD in Camarillo, California
 KWFT-LD in Fort Smith, Arkansas, on virtual channel 6
 KWNB-TV in Hayes Center, Nebraska, on virtual channel 6
 KXDP-LD in Denver, Colorado, an ATSC 3.0 station, on virtual channel 18
 KYMU-LD in Seattle, Washington, on virtual channel 6
 KZFW-LD in Dallas, Texas
 KZNO-LD in Big Bear Lake, California, an ATSC 3.0 station, on virtual channel 6
 W06AJ-D in Franklin, etc., North Carolina, on virtual channel 4, which rebroadcasts WYFF
 W06DA-D in Aguada, Puerto Rico, on virtual channel 6
 W06DI-D in Jasper, Florida
 W06DK-D in Florence, South Carolina
 WABW-TV in Pelham, Georgia, on virtual channel 14
 WATV-LD in Orlando, Florida, on virtual channel 47
 WDMY-LD in Toledo, Ohio
 WCES-TV in Wrens, Georgia, on virtual channel 20
 WDCN-LD in Fairfax, Virginia, an ATSC 3.0 station, on virtual channel 6
 WDHC-LD in Lebanon, Kentucky, on virtual channel 6
 WEYS-LD in Miami, Florida, an ATSC 3.0 station, on virtual channel 54
 WFIB-LD in Key West, Florida, on virtual channel 6
 WJMF-LD in Jackson, Mississippi
 WKBS-TV in Altoona, Pennsylvania, on virtual channel 47
 WMTO-LD in Norfolk, Virginia, an ATSC 3.0 station.
 WOUC-TV in Cambridge, Ohio, on virtual channel 44
 WPVI-TV in Philadelphia, Pennsylvania, on virtual channel 6
 WRME-LD in Chicago, Illinois, an ATSC 3.0 station, on virtual channel 33
 WTBS-LD in Atlanta, Georgia, an ATSC 3.0 station, on virtual channel 6
 WVCC-LD in Westmoreland, New Hampshire
 WVOA-LD in Westvale, New York
 WVUA in Tuscaloosa, Alabama, on virtual channel 23
 WWXY-LD in San Juan, Puerto Rico, to move to channel 2, on virtual channel 38

The following stations, which are no longer licensed, formerly broadcast on digital channel 6:
 K06KO-D in Kanarraville, etc., Utah
 K06LG-D in Chuathbaluk, Alaska
 K06NG-D in Sargents, Colorado
 K06OQ-D in Thomasville, Colorado
 K06OR-D in Seward, Alaska
 K06QG-D in Sioux City, Iowa
 K06QO-D in Martinsdale, Montana
 K06QQ-D in Superior, Montana
 KBOP-LD in Dallas, Texas
 KEFM-LD in Sacramento, California
 KNNN-LD in Redding, California
 KZFQ-LD in Royse City, Texas
 W06CM-D in Atlanta, Georgia
 WBPA-LD in Weirton, West Virginia

References

06 digital